George Broussard is an American video game producer and designer. He is one of the creators of the Duke Nukem series, along with Todd Replogle, Allen Blum, and Scott Miller.

Broussard released his early games under the name Micro F/X. In 1991, Broussard partnered with Scott Miller as co-owner of Apogee Software. Broussard is perhaps best known for his 12+ year development with many hurdles of Duke Nukem Forever as the lead project manager, before he asked Gearbox Software to take over, which ultimately finished the project. The 3D Realms website notes that he is probably the only person in the industry to have misspelled his own name (as "Broussad") on a shareware title he created on his own, Pharaoh's Tomb.

In 2013, Broussard competed in the indie game competition Ludum Dare with The Road, a side-scrolling browser game that reflects on the futility of existence.

Broussard suffered a minor stroke in May 2014 and recovered quickly.

References

External links 
 George Broussard's profile on LinkedIn
 
 Learn to Let Go: How Success Killed Duke Nukem on wired.com

Stephen F. Austin State University alumni
Living people
Place of birth missing (living people)
Year of birth missing (living people)
Video game designers